Moseley Village railway station is a railway station under construction in Moseley, Birmingham. It was first opened in 1867 and closed in 1941.

History
The station was opened by the Midland Railway on the former B&GR mainline (now the Camp Hill line) on 1 November 1867. Upon opening it was called Moseley station, forcing an existing downline station of the same name to be renamed 'Kings Heath'. From 1923, the station was operated by the London Midland and Scottish Railway.

The station closed on 27 January 1941 as an economy measure during the Second World War.  The buildings was demolished at some point thereafter.

Station masters

Samuel Bunning 1867—1868
H. Collyer 1868—1872
F. Bassano 1872—1873
H. Leobie 1873—1877
Charles J. Willcox 1877—1885
J. Belcher 1885—1889
Henry Harris 1889—1914
H.J. Turner 1939—1941(concurrently station master at Brighton Road and Camp Hill)

Reopening
In 2007 there were proposals to reopen the station and to resume local passenger services along the Camp Hill line, in which case the station would be served by trains between Birmingham Moor Street and Kings Norton railway station. In 2013 the proposal was shelved indefinitely.

In 2016, the newly created West Midlands Combined Authority, revived the plans to restore local passenger services to the line, and declared it one of their priority transport schemes to be delivered by 2025.
In 2019, the project to re-open the stations at Moseley, Kings Heath, and Hazelwell received £15 million in Government funding, with construction due to start in 2020 and aimed for completion in time for the 2022 Commonwealth Games. In March 2021 it was announced that funding had been found for the project, with an opening date expected in 2023.

A vote was held to determine the name of the station upon reopening, determined to be either 'Moseley' or 'Moseley Village'. On 14 June 2022, it was announced that the reopened station would be called Moseley Village.

References

Disused railway stations in Birmingham, West Midlands
Railway stations in Great Britain opened in 1867
Railway stations in Great Britain closed in 1941
Former Midland Railway stations
Moseley